The Moon Bus is an installation art in Xinyi District, Taipei, Taiwan. It was based on Taiwanese illustrator Jimmy Liao’s 1999 storybook When the Moon Forgot. From the outside, it looks like a normal bus, but head inside there are characters and scenes from Liao's children's books.

References

Installation art works
Xinyi Special District